The Sermon on the Mount (anglicized from the Matthean Vulgate Latin section title) is a collection of sayings attributed to Jesus of Nazareth found in the Gospel of Matthew (chapters 5, 6, and 7) that emphasizes his moral teachings. It is the first of five discourses in the Gospel and has been one of the most widely quoted sections of the Gospels.

Background and setting 

The Sermon on the Mount is placed relatively early in Matthew's portrayal of Jesus' ministry--following, in chapter 3, his baptism by John and, in chapter 4, his sojourn and temptation in the desert, his call of four disciples, and his early preaching in Galilee. 

The five discourses in the Gospel of Matthew are: the Sermon on the Mount (5-7), the discourse on discipleship (10), the discourse of parables (13), the discourse on the community of faith (18), and the discourse on future events (24-25). Also, like all the other "discourses," this one has Matthew's concluding statement (7:28-29) that distinguishes it from the material that follows. For similar statements at the end of the other discourses, see 11:1; 13:53; 19:1; 26:1.

It may be common to speculate on where the Sermon on the Mount occurred and designate it the Mount of Beatitudes. In fact, the traditional site is understood to be a hill on the shore of the Lake of Galilee.

Nevertheless, this long "sermon" is one of the most widely quoted sections of the Gospels, including some of the best-known sayings attributed to Jesus, such as the Beatitudes and the commonly recited version of the Lord's Prayer. It also contains what many consider to be the central tenets of Christian discipleship.

The setting for the "sermon" is given in Matthew 5:1-2. There, Jesus is said to see the crowds, to go up the mountain accompanied by his disciples, to sit down, and to begin his speech.

Components

Although the issues of Matthew's compositional plan for the Sermon on the Mount remain unresolved among scholars, its structural components  are clear.

Matthew 5:3–12 includes the Beatitudes. These describe the character of the people of the Kingdom of Heaven, expressed as "blessings". The Greek word most versions of the Gospel render as "blessed," can also be translated "happy" (Matthew 5:3–12 in Young's Literal Translation for an example). In Matthew, there are eight (or nine) blessings, while in Luke there are four, followed by four woes.

In almost all cases, the phrases used in the Beatitudes are familiar from an Old Testament context, but in the sermon Jesus gives them new meaning. Together, the Beatitudes present a new set of ideals that focus on love and humility rather than force and mastery; they echo the highest ideals of Jesus' teachings on spirituality and compassion.

In Christian teachings, the Works of Mercy, which have corporal and spiritual components, have resonated with the theme of the Beatitude for mercy. These teachings emphasize that these acts of mercy provide both temporal and spiritual benefits.

Matthew 5:13–16 presents the metaphors of salt and light. This completes the profile of God's people presented in the beatitudes and acts as the introduction to the next section.

There are two parts in this section, using the terms "salt of the earth" and Light of the World to refer to the disciples implying their value. Elsewhere, in John 8:12, Jesus applies 'Light of the World' to himself.

Jesus preaches about Hell and what Hell is like: "But I say unto you, That whosoever is angry with his brother without a cause shall be in danger of the judgment: and whosoever shall say to his brother "Raca (fool)" shall be in danger of the council: but whosoever shall say, Thou fool, shall be in danger of hell fire."

The longest section of the Sermon is Matthew 5:17–48, traditionally referred to as "the Antitheses" or "Matthew's Antitheses". In the section, Jesus fulfils and reinterprets the Old Covenant and in particular its Ten Commandments, contrasting with what "you have heard" from others. For example, he advises turning the other cheek, and to love one's enemies, in contrast to taking an eye for an eye. According to most interpretations of Matthew 5:17, 18, 19, and 20, and most Christian views of the Old Covenant, these new interpretations of the Law and Prophets are not opposed to the Old Testament, which was the position of Marcion, but form Jesus' new teachings which bring about salvation, and hence must be adhered to, as emphasized in Matthew 7:24–27 towards the end of the sermon.

In Matthew 6, Jesus condemns doing what would normally be "good works" simply for recognition and not from the heart, such as those of alms (6:1–4), prayer (6:5–15), and fasting (6:16–18). The discourse goes on to condemn the superficiality of materialism and calls the disciples not to worry about material needs, but to "seek" God's kingdom first. Within the discourse on ostentation, Matthew presents an example of correct prayer. Luke places this in a different context. The Lord's prayer (6:9–13) contains parallels to 1 Chronicles 29:10–18.

The first part of Matthew 7 (Matthew 7:1–6) deals with judging. Jesus condemns those who judge others before first judging themselves: "Judge not, that ye be not judged." Jesus concludes the sermon in Matthew 7:17–29 by warning against false prophets.

Teachings and theology

The teachings of the Sermon on the Mount have been a key element of Christian ethics, and for centuries the sermon has acted as a fundamental recipe for the conduct of the followers of Jesus. Various religious and moral thinkers (e.g. Leo Tolstoy and Mahatma Gandhi) have admired its message, and it has been one of the main sources of Christian pacifism.

In the 5th century, Saint Augustine began his book Our Lord's Sermon on the Mount by stating:

The last verse of chapter 5 of Matthew (Matthew 5:48) is a focal point of the Sermon that summarizes its teachings by advising the disciples to seek perfection. The Greek word  used to refer to perfection also implies an end, or destination, advising the disciples to seek the path towards perfection and the Kingdom of God. It teaches that God's children are those who act like God.

The teachings of the sermon are often referred to as the "Ethics of the Kingdom": they place a high level of emphasis on "purity of the heart" and embody the basic standard of Christian righteousness.

Theological structure
The theological structure of the Sermon on the Mount is widely discussed. One group of theologians ranging from Saint Augustine in the 5th century to Michael Goulder in the 20th century, see the Beatitudes as the central element of the Sermon. Others such as Günther Bornkamm see the Sermon arranged around the Lord's prayer, while Daniel Patte, closely followed by Ulrich Luz, see a chiastic structure in the sermon. Dale Allison and Glen Stassen have proposed a structure based on triads. Jack Kingsbury and Hans Dieter Betz see the sermon as composed of theological themes, e.g. righteousness or way of life.

Interpretation

The high ethical standards of the Sermon have been interpreted in a wide variety of ways by different Christian groups.

North American Biblical scholar Craig S. Keener finds at least 36 different interpretations of the message of the Sermon which he groups into eight views:
 The predominant medieval view, "reserving a higher ethic for clergy, especially in monastic orders"
 A view associated with Martin Luther that it represents an impossible demand, but serves to educate Christians on the ideals of their faith
 The Anabaptist a literal view which directly applies the teachings
 The Social Gospel view
 The Christian existentialism view
 Schweitzer's view of an imminent eschatology referring to an interim ethic
 Dispensational eschatology which refers to the future Kingdom of God
 Inaugurated eschatology in which the Sermon's ethics remain a goal to be approached, yet realized later

Comparison with the Sermon on the Plain
While Matthew groups Jesus' teachings into sets of similar material, the same material is scattered when found in Luke. The Sermon on the Mount may be compared with the similar but shorter Sermon on the Plain as recounted by the Gospel of Luke (Luke 6:17-49), which occurs at the same moment in Luke's narrative, and also features Jesus heading up a mountain, but giving the sermon on the way down at a level spot. Some scholars believe that they are the same sermon, while others hold that Jesus frequently preached similar themes in different places.

See also 
 Gospel harmony
 Jesus in Christianity
 Life of Jesus in the New Testament
 The Kingdom of God Is Within You, 1894 Leo Tolstoy book

References

Footnotes

Sources 

 Kissinger, Warren S. The Sermon on the Mount: A History of Interpretation and Bibliography. Metuchen: Scarecrow Press, 1975.

 Kodjak, Andrej. A Structural Analysis of the Sermon on the Mount. New York: M. de Gruyter, 1986.
 Lapide, Pinchas. The Sermon on the Mount, Utopia or Program for Action? translated from the German by Arlene Swidler. Maryknoll: Orbis Books, 1986.
 Lambrecht, Jan, S.J. The Sermon on the Mount. Michael Glazier: Wilmington, DE, 1985.
 McArthur, Harvey King. Understanding the Sermon on the Mount. Westport: Greenwood Press, 1978.
 Prabhavananda, Swami Sermon on the Mount According to Vedanta 1991 
 Easwaran Eknath. Original Goodness (on Beatitudes). Nilgiri Press, 1989. .
 Stassen, Glen H., and David P. Gushee. Kingdom Ethics: Following Jesus in Contemporary Context, InterVarsity Press, 2003. .
 Stassen, Glen H. Living the Sermon on the Mount: A Practical Hope for Grace and Deliverance, Jossey-Bass, 2006. .
 Stevenson, Kenneth. The Lord's prayer: a text in tradition, Fortress Press, 2004. .
 Soares de Azevedo, Mateus. Esoterism and Exoterism in the Sermon of the Mount. Sophia journal, Oakton, VA, USA. Vol. 15, Number 1, Summer 2009.
 Soares de Azevedo, Mateus. Christianity and the Perennial Philosophy, World Wisdom, 2006. .

External links 

 Sermon on the Mount as heart of Gospel's Law according to the Catechism of the Catholic Church.
 The Sermon on the Mount Site: Extensive range of Sermon on the Mount related resource
 Listen "Blessed are those who mourn" commentary
 The Sermon on the Mount as depicted by Claude Lorrain at the Frick Collection in New York City
 Read Christ Teaching the Beatitudes in the Americas in The Book of Mormon

 
New Testament words and phrases
Sayings of Jesus
Vulgate Latin words and phrases
Christian ethics in the Bible
Mosaic law in Christian theology
Ancient Roman speeches